The Frøyfjorden is a strait between the islands of Frøya and Hitra in Trøndelag county, Norway. The Frøya Tunnel goes beneath the fjord from Hammarvika in Frøya Municipality to the island of Dolmøya in Hitra Municipality.

References

Frøya, Trøndelag
Hitra
Fjords of Trøndelag